Bam County is in Kerman province, Iran. The capital of the county is the city of Bam. At the 2006 census, the county's population was 277,835 in 67,639 households. The following census in 2011 counted 195,603 people in 57,380 households, by which time Fahraj District and Chadegal Rural District had been separated from the county to form Fahraj County; Narmashir and Rud Ab Districts to become Narmashir County; and most of Rigan District to form Rigan County. At the 2016 census, the county's population was 228,241 in 71,338 households.

Arg e Bam (Bam Citadel) and its cultural landscape are located in Bam County.

Administrative divisions

The population history and structural changes of Bam County's administrative divisions over three consecutive censuses are shown in the following table. The latest census shows two districts, four rural districts, and two cities.

References

 

Counties of Kerman Province